

Winners

Results of individual events 
The tables below are World Junior medalists of individual events (boys' and girls' singles, boys' and girls' doubles, and mixed doubles).

Boys' singles

Girls' singles

Boys' doubles

Girls' doubles

Mixed doubles

Results of team events 
The tables below are World Junior Table Tennis Championships medalists of team events.

Boys' team

Girls' team

References

ITTF Statistics
ITTF Database

World Junior Table Tennis Championships
Table Tennis World Junior Championships
medalists